Retinal degeneration may refer to:

 Retinopathy, one of several eye diseases or eye disorders in humans
 Retinal degeneration (rhodopsin mutation)
 Progressive retinal atrophy, an eye disease in dogs

See also
 List of systemic diseases with ocular manifestations, in humans